Kenneth Bruce Mellor (born 15 September 1942 in Melbourne) is an Australian author, spiritual mentor and master who has published numerous works in professional journals, magazines and online.

Mellor has also written, co-authored or contributed to more than 18 books; and aspects of his work have been published in more than 18 languages.  He won first prize in the Spirituality Category for his latest book Inspiration, Meditation and Personal Wellbeing in the 2012 Next Generation Indie Book Awards and was a finalist in 2010 for his autobiography Urban Mystic.  He runs workshops worldwide on self-awakening, professional and personal development and parenting.
He has published many papers on the subject of Transactional Analysis.  He, with Eric Schiff (now Sigmund), was honoured with the Eric Berne Memorial Scientific Award in 1980 for their work on discounting and redefining.  His primary training is in social work and psychotherapy and he also trained intensely with three Indian masters during a 27-year period.  He runs a non-profit, educational, spiritually-oriented organisation called the Awakening Network Inc. with his wife Elizabeth Mellor.  They live in rural Victoria, Australia.  As well as writing books Ken has made more than 14 meditation recordings about relaxation, grounding, centering etc. which have proven extremely popular both in Australia and overseas.  Ken and Elizabeth are both listed in the biographical reference, Who's Who in Australia in Victoria, in recognition of their work.

Bibliography 

Autonomy with Integrity

Taking Charge: Task Analysis, Option Development, Problem Solving 

Transactional Analysis: “I’ll Use What Works” An Integrated Eclecticism in Experiential Psychotherapies in Australia, (Eds.) Dick Armstrong and Phill Boas (P.I.T. Press, Melbourne, 1980)

Hatha Yoga for Westerners 

Another Day Younger 

Pearls: Advice for the Path of Spiritual Awakening 

Urban Mystic 

Inspiration, Meditation and Personal Wellbeing

Co-authored with Elizabeth Mellor 

ParentCraft: Essential skills for raising children from infancy to adulthood (Finch Publishing, Sydney, 1999) (Published in 5 languages) 

Easy Parenting 

ParentCraft: A practical guide to raising children well (2nd Edition) 

The Happy Family 

Teen Stages: How to guide the journey to adulthood 

Personal Well Being

Meditation for Beginners

References

External links 
 Urban Mystic 
 Ken Mellor 

1942 births
Living people
Writers from Melbourne